Bruno Cassirer (12 December 1872 – 29 October 1941) was a publisher and gallery owner in Berlin who had a considerable influence on the cultural life of the city.

Biography
He was born on 12 December 1872 in Breslau, the second child of Jewish parents, Julius and Julcher Cassirer. Julius was a partner, with two of Bruno's cousins, in a cable factory. Julius completed his final school examination in 1890 at the Leibniz-Gymnasium.

In 1898, together with his cousin Paul Cassirer, he opened a gallery and bookshop at 35 Viktoriastraße near Kemperplatz, Berlin. On 2 May 1898 the artists' association Berlin Secession was established with Paul and Bruno as secretaries. For three years they acquainted the art and literature scenes of Berlin with the newest waves from Belgian, English, French and Russian culture.

In 1901, Bruno and Paul divided the business into separate parts, with Paul running the gallery and art dealership, whilst Bruno owned the publishing side which relocated to 15 Derfflingerstraße. In 1902 he founded the monthly art journal Kunst und Künstler (Art and Artist) which turned out to become an influential and prestigious forum until it was closed down by the Nazis in 1933. In 1903 Christian Morgenstern joined as literary editor and the journal "Das Theater" was founded under his direction.

In 1936 Jewish printers were removed from membership of the Reichsschrifttumskammer (RSK) and the last book appeared from the Cassirer publishing house. In 1938 part of the Cassirer family decided to emigrate to Oxford where Bruno founded a new publishing house.

He died on 20 October 1941 in Oxford, England.

After the death of Bruno Cassirer, his son-in law Dr. George Hill (born Günther Hell) continued the publishing business until he died in 1995.

Other notable members of Bruno Cassirer's family included the philosopher Ernst Cassirer and the neurologist Richard Cassirer.

References

External links

 Cassirer collection, 1906-1933 (.5 linear ft) is housed in the Department of Special Collections and University Archives at Stanford University Libraries
 Bruno Cassirer (Publishers) Ltd. at Database – Jewish Publishers of German Literature in Exile, 1933-1945
 Cassirer and Cohen: histories, relatives and descendants at metastudies.net

1872 births
1941 deaths
Businesspeople from Wrocław
Businesspeople from Berlin
Jewish emigrants from Nazi Germany to the United Kingdom
German publishers (people)
19th-century German Jews
German magazine founders
Subjects of Nazi art appropriations